Vivica Anjanetta Fox (born July 30, 1964) is an American actress, producer, and television host. Fox began her career on Soul Train (19821983). She eventually continued her career with roles on the daytime television soap operas Days of Our Lives (1988) and Generations (19891991), subsequently shifting to the prime-time slot, starring opposite Patti LaBelle, in the NBC sitcom Out All Night (19921993). Fox's breakthrough came in 1996, with roles in two box-office hit films, Roland Emmerich's Independence Day and F. Gary Gray's Set It Off.

Fox has starred in the films Booty Call (1997), Soul Food (1997), Why Do Fools Fall in Love (1998), Kingdom Come (2001), Two Can Play That Game (2001), and Boat Trip (2002). She played Vernita Green in Kill Bill and landed supporting roles in films like Ella Enchanted (2004). 
She scored leading roles in the short-lived Fox sitcom Getting Personal (1998) and the CBS medical drama City of Angels (2000). From 2003 to 2006, she co-starred in and produced the Lifetime crime drama series, Missing, for which she received an NAACP Image Award for Outstanding Actress in a Drama Series. Fox has also produced a number of straight-to-video films.

Early life 
Fox was born in South Bend, Indiana, the daughter of Everlyena, a pharmaceutical technician, and William Fox, a school administrator. Her parents relocated to the Benton Harbor, Michigan area soon after her birth. Fox is a 1982 graduate of Arlington High School in Indianapolis and subsequently graduated from Golden West College in Huntington Beach, California, with an AA degree in Social Sciences.

Career

19821995
In 1982, Fox relocated to California to attend Golden West College. While in California, she was a dancer on Soul Train from 1983 to 1984, and also appeared in the music video for R&B group Klymaxx's hit single, "Meeting in the Ladies Room". Afterwards, she started acting professionally, first on the NBC daytime soap opera Days of Our Lives in 1988, playing Carmen Silva. After making her debut as a sex worker in Oliver Stone's war drama film Born on the Fourth of July (1989), she was cast as Emily Franklin in the pilot episode of ABC comedy series, Living Dolls, a spin-off of the sitcom Who's the Boss? but was replaced with Halle Berry for the remaining episodes. Later that year, Fox was cast as Maya Reubens, the leading character in the NBC daytime soap opera Generations. The series broke new ground as the first soap opera to feature an African-American family from its inception.

In the early 1990s, Fox began appearing in prime time television, playing guest-starring roles on The Fresh Prince of Bel-Air, Beverly Hills, 90210, Family Matters, Matlock, and Martin. In 1992, she was cast as Patti LaBelle's fashion-designer daughter, Charisse Chamberlain, on the NBC sitcom Out All Night. In addition to this role, she returned to soap operas, playing the role of Dr. Stephanie Simmons on CBS' The Young and the Restless from 1994 to 1995. In 1995, she also had a cameo role in the comedy film Don't Be a Menace to South Central While Drinking Your Juice in the Hood.

19962003

In 1996, Fox played Will Smith's character's girlfriend, Jasmine Dubrow, in the epic science fiction disaster blockbuster Independence Day, directed by Roland Emmerich. The film grossed over $800 million worldwide. Fox received an MTV Movie Award for Best Kiss with Smith, and was nominated for a Saturn Award for Best Supporting Actress. Later that year, she played Francesca "Frankie" Sutton in the crime action film Set It Off opposite Jada Pinkett Smith, Queen Latifah and Kimberly Elise. Directed by F. Gary Gray, Set It Off became a critical and box office success, grossing over $41 million against a budget of $9 million. In 1997, Fox starred in three movies: Booty Call, a Columbia Pictures comedy opposite Jamie Foxx; the superhero film Batman & Robin; and 20th Century Fox's critically acclaimed comedy-drama Soul Food. The latter was a major box office success. For her role, Fox received her first NAACP Image Award for Outstanding Actress in a Motion Picture nomination, and MTV Movie Award for Best Performance.

Fox had additional leading roles on television. She played Queen of Sheba in the British television film Solomon in 1997. That same year, she starred opposite Arsenio Hall in the short-lived ABC sitcom Arsenio. In 1998, she was lead actress in the short-lived Fox sitcom Getting Personal. Also in 1998, Fox starred alongside Halle Berry, Lela Rochon and Larenz Tate in the romantic drama film Why Do Fools Fall in Love, playing one of the three wives of singer Frankie Lymon. The following year, she appeared in stoner comedy horror Idle Hands, and Teaching Mrs. Tingle with Helen Mirren. In 2000, she starred alongside Blair Underwood in the short-lived CBS medical drama, City of Angels.

In 2001, Fox played Lucille Slocumb in Kingdom Come, a comedy-drama starring LL Cool J, Jada Pinkett Smith, and Whoopi Goldberg. That same year, she was the lead in the romantic comedy Two Can Play That Game, and had a supporting role in the independent comedy-drama Little Secrets. In 2002, she starred alongside Miguel A. Núñez Jr. in Juwanna Mann and Cuba Gooding Jr. in Boat Trip. In 2003, Quentin Tarantino cast her as Vernita Green in his two-part martial arts film Kill Bill.

2004present
From 2004 to 2006, Fox co-produced and starred as FBI special agent Nicole Scott in the Lifetime television crime drama series Missing. She received the NAACP Image Award for Outstanding Actress in a Drama Series for her role in 2006. During this time, Fox produced and played the leading roles in several films, including Motives, The Salon, Getting Played, and Three Can Play That Game. From 2007 to 2009, she had a recurring role in the HBO comedy series Curb Your Enthusiasm, as the mother of a family displaced by a hurricane and taken in by Larry and Cheryl.

Fox was a judge on The WB's talent show The Starlet. She participated in the third season of ABC's hit television show, Dancing with the Stars, but was voted off after the fourth week. In 2009, Fox served as celebrity spokesperson for the then newly revamped Psychic Friends Network. After receiving backlash for her involvement with the network, Fox denied any involvement with the company, despite having filmed a commercial and promo video which had already gone to air. She hosted her own VH1 reality series Glam God with Vivica A. Fox (2008), TV Land's The Cougar (2009), and Lifetime's Prank My Mom (2012). She was also a contestant on The Apprentice in 2015.

In the late 2000s and 2010s, Fox had supporting roles in movies poorly received by critics, such as The Hard Corps (2006) alongside Jean-Claude Van Damme, Kickin' It Old Skool (2007) starring Jamie Kennedy, and Private Valentine: Blonde & Dangerous (2008) with Jessica Simpson. On television, she had guest starring roles on Law & Order, Drop Dead Diva, Melissa & Joey, Femme Fatales, and Raising Hope. As a regular, Fox starred in the syndicated sitcom Mr. Box Office alongside Bill Bellamy and Jon Lovitz.

In 2012, she acted in the Nigerian action drama film Black November, starring Mickey Rourke, Kim Basinger, Akon, and Wyclef Jean. In 2013, Fox landed a part in the Christian sports drama, Home Run. The film had a limited release on April 19, 2013, in the United States and has grossed over $2.8 million. On the review aggregator Rotten Tomatoes, the movie received 45% positive reviews from 11 critics. Fox also gave her voice to the direct-to-DVD animated movie Scooby-Doo! Stage Fright. In October 2013, she had a supporting role in the Christmas movie So This Is Christmas, alongside Eric Roberts. In 2014, she participated in the acclaimed parodic TV movie Sharknado 2: The Second One. Later that year, Fox starred in Mercenaries, alongside Kristanna Loken, Brigitte Nielsen, Cynthia Rothrock, Zoë Bell, and Nicole Bilderback.

In 2015, she was cast as Cookie Lyon's sister for the second season of Empire. She was a recurring cast member as of the second season and was promoted to series regular for its sixth and final season. She acted in the comedy-drama, Chocolate City, alongside Robert Ri'chard, Michael Jai White, Carmen Electra. In the United States, the film was released in a limited release and through video on demand on May 22, 2015. Freestyle Releasing handled the theatrical release, with Paramount Home Entertainment handling the video on demand and home media release of the film. The film debuted on BET on June 10, 2015. Fox was in the crime action thriller The Good, the Bad, and the Dead, starring Johnny Messner, Dolph Lundgren, Danny Trejo, and Michael Paré. She also appeared in the movie True to the Game, based on Teri Woods' novel of the same name. 

Fox reprised her Independence Day role in Roland Emmerich's Independence Day: Resurgence, released on June 24, 2016. That same year, it was announced that she would portray the president of the United States in the science fiction film "Crossbreed", making her the first African-American woman to portray the role in a feature film.  She was also cast in the television film The Wrong Roommate.

On January 4, 2017, Lifetime launched the premiere of her new venture "Vivica's Black Magic" which was an exotic male review. During this time, she had a supporting role in the movie Chocolate City: Vegas Strip starring Robert Ri'chard, Michael Jai White, Mekhi Phifer, Ginuwine, and Melanie Brown. On August 12, 2017, the movie was made available on Netflix. Fox appeared as Cheer Goddess in the film Bring It On: Worldwide Cheersmack. She also starred in the TV biopic Bobbi Kristina, based on the life of Whitney Houston's daughter Bobbi Kristina. Fox acted in the independent drama, Jason's Letter. The film made its premiere on June 11, 2017, at the Schwartz Center for the Arts in Dover.

In 2018, the actress released a book. Vivica's Every Day I'm Hustling (St. Martin's Press, 2018) is a "part memoir, part inspirational" book that focuses on her career and relationships. The same year, she appeared in the TV movie The Last Sharknado: It's About Time. She was hired to host the TV talk show Face the Truth on CBS, which lasted only one season. She also had a role in the erotic romantic thriller Kinky. The film was released in the United States on October 12, 2018, by Patriot Pictures. In December 2018, she appeared in two Christmas movies: Christmas with a View, starring Patrick Duffy and A Wedding for Christmas.

In 2019, Fox starred in several David DeCoteau TV movies, including The Wrong Stepmother, The Wrong Boy Next Door, The Wrong Mommy, The Wrong Tutor and The Wrong Cheerleader. She appeared as Dr. Angela Foster in the TV series The Bay, and starred in the drama film Fire And Rain. She also acted in two Christmas themed TV movies: 2nd Chance for Christmas and Christmas Matchmakers, starring Dorian Gregory.

In 2020, she starred in the movie Arkansas, alongside Liam Hemsworth, John Malkovich, and Vince Vaughn. That same year, she starred in the movie Hooking Up, and had a role in the movie True to the Game 2 starring Tamar Braxton, which was released on April 10. She also starred in the movie Rev, released in May 2020.

Fox later competed in season six of The Masked Singer as "Mother Nature". She was the second to be eliminated during the two-night premiere, alongside Dwight Howard as "Octopus" and Toni Braxton as "Pufferfish". However, her unmasking occurred at the beginning of the second part, as the first part ended in a cliffhanger.

Personal life
In December 1998, Fox married singer Christopher "Sixx-Nine" Harvest. The couple divorced in 2002. Fox briefly dated rapper 50 Cent in 2003. In November 2011, Fox and club promoter Omar "Slimm" White broke off their 10-month engagement. Fox stated her biggest regret is that she did not have children.

On September 20, 2020, Fox backed out of co-hosting a "Live From the Red Carpet" virtual pre-show for the 72nd Primetime Emmy Awards, because she tested positive for COVID-19. She later said this test result was a false positive.

Fox is a member of Zeta Phi Beta sorority; she was inducted as an honorary member in November 2020.

Filmography

Film and TV Movies

Television

Video Games

Music Videos

Documentary

Awards and nominations

References

External links 

 

1964 births
20th-century American actresses
21st-century American actresses
Actors from South Bend, Indiana
Actresses from Indianapolis
African-American actresses
American film actresses
American people who self-identify as being of Native American descent
American soap opera actresses
American television actresses
American women film producers
American women television producers
American voice actresses
Film producers from Indiana
Living people
Participants in American reality television series
The Apprentice (franchise) contestants
20th-century African-American women
20th-century African-American people
21st-century African-American women
21st-century African-American people
Television producers from Indiana